"For You" is a song recorded by Swedish singer Mariette. The song was released as a digital download in February 2018. It took part in Melodifestivalen 2018, where it qualified to the final from the fourth semi-final, finishing in 5th place overall. The song is written by Jörgen Elofsson and peaked at number 13 on the Swedish single chart.

Charts

References

2018 singles
2018 songs
English-language Swedish songs
Melodifestivalen songs of 2018
Mariette Hansson songs
Songs written by Jörgen Elofsson